Maresville is a commune in the Pas-de-Calais department in the Hauts-de-France region of France.

Geography
Maresville is situated 4 miles (6 km) north of Montreuil-sur-Mer, on the D146 road. Near to Longvilliers and not far from the coastal town of Le Touquet, it is home to 102 people (2017).

Places of interest
The town has no shops, though is home to a small farm with a produce shop and the beautiful fifteenth century church of St. Maur. There is a small hotel that has a great reputation and a restaurant that draws people from miles around.

Population

See also
Communes of the Pas-de-Calais department

References

Communes of Pas-de-Calais